Miguel Arturo Ojeda (born January 29, 1975) is a Mexican former professional baseball catcher. He has also served as a manager for both the Mexican Baseball League and Minor League Baseball.

Playing career

Minor League Career

Ojeda was signed by the Pittsburgh Pirates in 1993 from the Mexico City Reds.

Major League Career

Ojeda played in Major League Baseball from 2003 to 2006. He made his debut with the San Diego Padres on May 17, 2003.

Ojeda was invited to spring training with the Colorado Rockies prior to the  season as a non-roster invitee. He was not expected to make the roster; however, when Yorvit Torrealba was injured, Ojeda made the Opening Day roster serving as the backup catcher to starter Danny Ardoin. Although Ojeda impressed early in the 2006 season, providing the team with valuable clutch hitting and serviceable defense, he was sent down to Triple-A Colorado Springs once Torrealba was activated. Ojeda was then loaned to Mexico City of the Mexican League, before being traded to the Texas Rangers.

Ojeda signed a one-year, $430,000 contract with the Texas Rangers for the  season on November 16, 2006. On April 1, he was optioned to the Triple-A Oklahoma RedHawks. On May 27, Ojeda was designated for assignment. In 2016, Ojeda was hired as the manager for the San Francisco Giants' Double-A team, the Richmond Flying Squirrels.

Managing career

In 2012, Ojeda was named as the Manager of the Diablos Rojos in the Mexican League. Ojeda was named the 2014 Mexican League Manager of the Year and led the Red Devils (70-42) to their 16th title in franchise history. In 2015. he was selected as the manager of the AA Richmond Flying Squirrels.

In 2018, he became part-owner of the Generales de Durango club of the Mexican League.

On 2 February 2021, he was appointed manager of the Diablos Rojos, replacing Sergio Gastélum.

References

External links

1975 births
Living people
Baseball players from Sonora
Carolina Mudcats players
Colorado Rockies players
Colorado Springs Sky Sox players
Diablos Rojos del México players
Gulf Coast Pirates players
Major League Baseball catchers
Major League Baseball players from Mexico
Mexican expatriate baseball players in the United States
Mexican League baseball catchers
Mexican League baseball first basemen
Mexican League baseball managers
Minor league baseball managers
Oklahoma RedHawks players
Portland Beavers players
San Diego Padres players
Seattle Mariners players
Tacoma Rainiers players
Texas Rangers players
Vaqueros Laguna players
Venados de Mazatlán players
Tigres de Quintana Roo players
Welland Pirates players
2006 World Baseball Classic players
2009 World Baseball Classic players
People from Guaymas